Grant Campbell Hanley (born 20 November 1991) is a Scottish professional footballer who plays as a defender for  club Norwich City and the Scotland national team. He has previously played for Blackburn Rovers and Newcastle United.

Early years
Hanley was born in Dumfries. He was involved at youth level with local club Queen of the South, Crewe Alexandra and with Rangers before he joined Blackburn Rovers as a 16-year-old in 2008.

Club career

Blackburn Rovers
At Rovers, Hanley was captain of the under-18 team. Hanley made his Premier League debut for Rovers in a 1–0 win at Aston Villa on 9 May 2010. Hanley committed his future when he signed a new five-year deal with Blackburn on 21 July 2010.

Hanley made his first Premier League appearance of season 2010–11 as a 67th-minute substitute in a 1–1 draw at home to West Ham United. He made his FA Cup debut on 8 January 2011, against Queens Park Rangers in a 1–0 victory at Ewood Park. On 5 March 2011, Hanley scored his first goal for Rovers in a 3–2 defeat against Fulham at Craven Cottage. That was the last of his nine Blackburn first team appearances that season although he was to make his international debut at the end of the season. On 31 December 2011, Hanley started and scored the winning goal in a 3–2 win against local rivals Manchester United at Old Trafford. This win lifted Blackburn off the bottom of the table. On 14 April 2012, in a Premier League fixture against Swansea City at the Liberty Stadium, he suffered ankle ligament damage. Hanley made 28 appearances and scored one goal in all competitions for Rovers but the club was relegated into the Championship.

In the 2012–13 season Hanley maintained his first team place and formed a partnership with Scott Dann. At the end of the season, he signed a five-year contract with the club.

After Dann left for Crystal Palace in January 2014, Hanley was appointed as the new captain of the club.

Newcastle United
On 21 July 2016, Hanley signed for newly relegated Championship club Newcastle United on a five-year contract for an undisclosed fee. He was handed the number 5 shirt, previously worn by Georginio Wijnaldum.
He scored his first goal for the club in the 79th minute in a 6–0 win versus Queens Park Rangers at Loftus Road.

Norwich City

2017–18
On 30 August 2017, Hanley joined Norwich City on a four-year deal for an undisclosed fee. He made his debut on 9 September 2017, coming on as a substitute in a 1–0 win over Birmingham City at Carrow Road. Although he had been something of an emergency buy, with Norwich having started the season with a number of injuries and playing inexperienced centre backs, Hanley soon became a regular in the team, often being deployed as one of three centre halves with Timm Klose and Christoph Zimmermann. He ultimately made 32 league appearances for Norwich during the 2017–18 season, plus two in the FA Cup. One of his most memorable contributions came in the derby game against Ipswich Town on 18 February. Ipswich had gone 1–0 up in the 89th minute and seemed set for a first win over Norwich in nine years. However, deep into added time, Hanley chased a ball to the byline and crossed it back into the goal area, allowing Klose to head it home for an equaliser. The following month, on 17 March, Hanley scored his first goal for Norwich, the second in a 3–2 win over Reading.

2018–19
At the beginning of the 2018–19 season, with Russell Martin leaving the club, Hanley was appointed Norwich's new club captain ahead of Ivo Pinto, who had deputised for Martin for much of the previous season. He played in Norwich's opening six league games, getting his second goal for the club in a 4–3 defeat against West Bromwich Albion; however, he was then injured in training. During his absence, Klose and Zimmermann established themselves at centre-back, with Ben Godfrey also becoming a regular choice, and Hanley was restricted to a few appearances as substitute on his return. When he finally started a game, an FA Cup tie against Portsmouth, he was sent off in the first fifteen minutes for a professional foul on Ronan Curtis and Norwich went on to lose 1–0. Despite his lack of game time, Hanley remained club captain as Norwich gained promotion to the Premier League. In the final game of the season, as Norwich defeated Aston Villa 2–1, winning the Championship title, Hanley was brought on as an 89th minute substitute for Onel Hernandez and lifted the Championship trophy alongside team captain Zimmermann.

2019–20
Hanley scored an own goal in a 4–1 defeat against Liverpool on 9 August, which was the first goal of the 2019–20 Premier League season. Despite this, he retained his place for the next two Premier League games until he was once more injured in training. He would later admit he had been injured at the start of the season. Norwich suffered several injuries at centre-back throughout the season, with midfielders Alexander Tettey and Ibrahim Amadou both being deployed as makeshift centre-halves at various points. As a result, despite not being an automatic choice, Hanley made 15 appearances in the season's first 29 league games, as well as helping Norwich reach their first FA Cup quarter-final in over 20 years with a goal in a 2–1 win over Burnley. However, at that stage, the season was suspended because of the COVID-19 pandemic. When it resumed after three months, Hanley was again injured. He played no further part in the season as Norwich finished bottom of the Premier League and were relegated back to the Championship.

2020–21
With the new season starting only two months later, Hanley would again start a season injured. He would make his first appearance of the season on 17 October in Norwich's fifth game, a 2–1 win over Rotherham United. However, from then on, he would not miss a game, making 42 league appearances and 2 FA Cup appearances, as well as contributing a goal in a 2–1 win over Cardiff City.  With Godfrey having left the club, Klose absent on loan and Zimmermann absent through injury, Hanley spent most of the season partnered with Ben Gibson, as Norwich won the Football League Championship for the second time in three seasons. He came second behind Emi Buendia in Norwich's Player of the Season vote and, after Norwich finished the season with a 2–2 draw with Barnsley, he lifted the trophy alongside outgoing teammate Tettey, who had been made captain for the game but had handed the armband back to Hanley when he was substituted in the 87th minute.

2021–22
Ahead of Norwich's return to the Premier League, Hanley extended his contract with the club until 30 June 2025. He scored his first goal of the season on 20 November in Norwich's 2–1 win against Southampton, the first game in charge for new manager Dean Smith. Hanley suffered an injury, his second of the season, early on in the game with Manchester United on 11 December, having to be replaced by Jacob Sørenson, with Norwich going on to lose the match 1–0., but returned to the starting line-up in January.

Hanley would make a total of 33 Premier League appearances in the season, usually partnered with Gibson, as well as two appearances in the FA Cup and one in the Carabao Cup. However, it would be another disappointing season for Norwich, as they finished bottom and were once again relegated back to the Championship after only one season. Hanley was one of the few Norwich players to come in for any praise: He again came second in the club's Player of the Season vote, this time losing out to Teemu Pukki.

2022–23
Hanley received a red card in the first league game of the season, a 1–0 defeat at Cardiff City. He scored his first goal of the season in a 1–1 draw at Reading in early October.

International career
Hanley captained Scotland at under-19 level. On 17 November 2010, he played for Scotland under-21s when aged 18 in a 3–1 win against Northern Ireland at Firhill.

On 1 February 2011, Hanley was called up to the senior Scotland squad for the first time ahead of the game against Northern Ireland in the Nations Cup. He made his full international debut as an 84th-minute substitute on 25 May 2011 coming on for Gary Caldwell against Wales in the Nations Cup in Dublin. His first Scotland goal was in his fifth full international when he opened the scoring in a 2014 FIFA World Cup qualifier at home against Wales on 22 March 2013 at Hampden Park.

In May 2021, he was named in Steve Clarke's 26-man squad for UEFA Euro 2021, appearing in all three matches against the Czech Republic, England and Croatia.

Career statistics

Club

International

Scores and results list Scotland goal tally first, score column indicates score after each Hanley goal.

Honours
Newcastle United
EFL Championship: 2016–17

Norwich City
EFL Championship: 2018–19, 2020–21
Individual

 EFL Championship Team of the Season: 2020–21
 PFA Team of the Year: 2020–21 Championship

References

External links

Grant Hanley profile at the Scottish Football Association website

1991 births
Living people
Footballers from Dumfries
Scottish footballers
Association football defenders
Blackburn Rovers F.C. players
Newcastle United F.C. players
Norwich City F.C. players
Premier League players
English Football League players
Scotland youth international footballers
Scotland under-21 international footballers
Scotland international footballers
UEFA Euro 2020 players